Red Cavalry is an oil on canvas painting of 1932 by the Russian avant-garde artist Kazimir Malevich. It depicts Red Cavalry horsemen racing across a plain, the ground beneath them illustrated with Suprematist stripings of color. It is considered Malevich's only contribution into the pantheon of Soviet art; Malevich intentionally dated the work to 1918, and added the blurb “From the capital of the October Revolution, the Red Cavalry rides to defend the Soviet frontier” on the back.

References

1932 paintings
Paintings by Kazimir Malevich
Collections of the Russian Museum